Ice hockey at the 2015 European Youth Olympic Winter Festival was held at the Montafon Aktivpark in Schruns, Austria from 26 to 30 January 2015. Six countries participated in this event.

Group stage
All times are local (UTC+1).

Group A

Group B

Knockout stage

Fifth place game

Bronze medal game

Final

References
Results

2015 European Youth Olympic Winter Festival
European Youth Olympics
2015
2015 European Youth Olympics